Ryszard Jerzy Gryglewski (4 August 1932 – 30 January 2023) was a Polish pharmacologist and physician. Member of the Polish Academy of Learning (PAU) and the Polish Academy of Sciences (PAN).

Gryglewski graduated in Medicine from the Jagiellonian University in Kraków, where he also wrote his doctorate in Pharmacology and in 1971 became a professor. He was a member of many pharmacological associations around the world and since 1993 president of the Jagiellonian Medical Research Centre (Jagiellońskie Centrum Badań Medycznych).

His scientific work concerned experimental pharmacology. His research focused on the contribution of the blood-vascular system in building up immunity against thrombosis in the development of sclerosis. In 1976, together with S. Bunting, J. Vane and S. Moncada, he discovered prostacyclin, which set off many further scientific discoveries.

Gryglewski died in Kraków on 30 January 2023, at the age of 90.

References

Sources
RYSZARD GRYGLEWSKI
Gryglewski awarded honorary degree from Medical University of Łódź
Gryglewski family history

1932 births
2023 deaths
Polish scientists
Polish pharmacologists
People from Vilnius
Members of the Polish Academy of Sciences